Rufus Smith (MD) (November 19, 1766 – November 15, 1844) was a physician and politician in the British colonial Province of New Brunswick, Canada.

Born in Stamford in the Colony of Connecticut, after the American Revolutionary War his Loyalist family emigrated to New Brunswick, Canada, settling in a rural area on the west bank of the Missaguash River near the present-day town of  Sackville.

Trained in medicine, Dr. Rufus Smith had a large practice, serving the residents across the Isthmus of Chignecto. In 1789, he married Elizabeth Dixon (1770–1859) of Sackville. They had five daughters and two sons. In 1817, he was elected to the 6th New Brunswick Legislative Assembly as a representative for the County of Westmorland. He was the representative again in the 7th and 8th Assemblies, serving until 1827, then again in the 10th Assembly from 1831 to 1834.

Rufus Smith died in 1844 and is buried in the Methodist Church cemetery at Point de Bute. His daughter, Diana Gay Smith, married Lestock P. W. DesBrisay, a businessman from Richibucto, New Brunswick who would represent  Kent County in the Legislative Assembly of New Brunswick from 1856 to 1866.

References 

1766 births
1844 deaths
Physicians from New Brunswick
Members of the Legislative Assembly of New Brunswick
People of colonial Connecticut
United Empire Loyalists
People from Sackville, New Brunswick
Colony of New Brunswick people